Eventually is the second solo album by Paul Westerberg, released on April 30, 1996, on Reprise Records.

The album started out in Atlanta, with producer Brendan O'Brien. Although those sessions produced good results—the leadoff single, "Love Untold", among them—Westerberg and O'Brien parted ways. O'Brien was pressed for time, and Westerberg needed more time to write enough songs to fill out a full album. Westerberg regrouped with Lou Giordano.

The song "Good Day" was written for late Replacements guitarist Bob Stinson. It references "Hold My Life", a track from the album Tim. "Love Untold" was released as a single, peaking on the Billboard Alternative Songs chart at #21 on June 1, 1996.

Track listing
All songs written by Paul Westerberg, except where noted
"These Are the Days" – 3:58
"Century" – 4:35
"Love Untold" – 4:16
"Ain't Got Me" – 3:25
"You've Had It with You" – 3:11
"MamaDaddyDid" – 2:57
"Hide n Seekin'" – 3:06
"Once Around the Weekend" – 3:56
"Trumpet Clip" – 3:17
"Angels Walk" – 3:22
"Good Day" – 4:19
"Time Flies Tomorrow" – 4:33
Japanese edition bonus track
"Make Your Own Kind of Music" (Barry Mann, Cynthia Weil) – 3:34

Personnel
Paul Westerberg – guitar, vocals, organ, bass guitar, piano, saxophone
Eddie Miller – percussion
Keith Christopher – bass guitar
Michael Bland – drums, percussion
Brendan O'Brien – acoustic guitar, bass guitar, keyboards
Josh Freese – drums, percussion
Tommy Stinson – bass guitar and trombone on "Trumpet Clip"
Davey Faragher – bass guitar
Michael Urbano – drums, percussion, trombone

References

1996 albums
Albums produced by Brendan O'Brien (record producer)
Paul Westerberg albums
Reprise Records albums
Albums produced by Lou Giordano